Stickland is a surname of British origin, which may be a locational surname, indicating a person from the village of Stickland in the parish of Winterborne Stickland, Dorset. Alternatively, it may be a topographic name for a person who lived by a steep slope, from the Middle English stickel ("steep") and "land". The surname may refer to:

Jonathan Stickland (born 1983), American politician
L. H. Stickland, British biochemist
Lee Stickland, New Zealand soccer player
Paul Stickland (born 1957), British illustrator

See also
Strickland (surname)

References

Surnames of British Isles origin
English toponymic surnames